Greater Tehran Metropolitan Area is the urban agglomeration around Tehran that covers the central part of the Tehran Province and eastern part of the Alborz Province, that covers the contiguous cities of Tehran, Ray, Shemirānāt, and other areas.

As of 2012, Greater Tehran had a population of close to 14 million residents. The 2016 census had the population at 13.3 million in Tehran Province (only 200 thousands of them outside Tehran and the suburban counties) and 2.2 million in Karaj and Fardis combined. So it can be estimated that the population of the urban agglomeration was about 15 million people in 2016, and it is sinking 25 cm per year because of the accelerated influx and the overuse of natural resources.

Since the 1960s, much of Greater Tehran's growth has been caused by an influx of urban poor into informal settlements on the fringe.

Greater Tehran should not be confused with the following:

 Tehran Province (area 18,814 km2, population 13.27 m – 2016). Part of the province is too far from Tehran and has too low a population density to be classified as the part of agglomeration
 Tehran County (area 1,300 km2, population 8.85 million (2016) with 97.5% of the population living in Tehran City itself)
 Tehran City includes 22 districts, two of them fully and one partially are located outside of Tehran County. The city's area is about 730 km2. The extension of the city to other counties began in 1973 to include the villages surrounding the city of Tajrish (Evin, Darakeh, Niyavaran, Rostan Abad, Gholhak, Zargandeh, Elahiyeh, Davoudiyeh, and Zarrabkhaneh) and the cities of Vanak and Rey to which “Kooye Siman” had been annexed during the years 1956 to 1966.

Geographys

There is no exact definition of Tehran agglomeration borders and composition. Beside Tehran County, also Shemiranat County, Ray County, Eslamshahr County, Pakdasht County, Robat-Karim County, Varamin County, Shahriar County, Qods County, Malard County, Pishva County, and Baharestan County in Tehran Province and also Karaj County and probably even Nazarabad County and Savojbolagh County in Alborz Province can be regarded as parts of the agglomeration.

References 

Tehran
Geography of Tehran
Tehran